Anurida stereoodorata is a species of springtails  (arthropod) endemic to the Krubera-Voronja cave system in Georgia. It is one of the deepest terrestrial animals ever found on Earth, living at > below the cave entrance. 
It was discovered in the CAVEX Team expedition of 2010.

References

Neanuridae
Extant Early Devonian first appearances
Fauna of Georgia (country)
Cave arthropods